van Rankin is a surname. Notable people with the surname include:

Allan van Rankin (born 1987), Mexican footballer of Dutch descent, nephew of Jorge
Jorge van Rankin (born 1963), Mexican radio and television personality
Josecarlos Van Rankin (born 1993), Mexican footballer

Surnames of Dutch origin